The Audi Q8 is a mid-size luxury crossover SUV coupé made by Audi that was launched in 2018. It is the flagship of the Audi SUV line, and is being produced at the Volkswagen Bratislava Plant.

Overview
BMW launched its coupe SUV in 2008, the BMW X6, and Mercedes-Benz followed suit in 2015 with the GLE-Class Coupe. Audi never made a direct competitor but had been planning to once the new bodystyle became a sales success for other brands.

The Q8 is the first SUV model under Audi's new head of design, Marc Lichte, and introduced a new design language for the brand's SUVs. The grill is larger and now has an octagonal shape, with both vertical and horizontal slats, and the character lines of the Q8 are inspired by the Audi Quattro rally car from the 1980s. The Q8 features full-laser headlamps and taillamps, the first-ever in a crossover or SUV. The interior features the knob-less MMI system, three touch screens and an enlarged virtual cockpit which has a fully digital instrument cluster. Additionally, both haptic and acoustic feedback are provided in response to user inputs.

The Q8 is slightly shorter than the Q7 in terms of both length and height, but is slightly wider. It also has less cargo space than the Q7 due to its sloped roofline, and unlike the Q7, the Q8 is not available with third-row seats. According to the Volkswagen Group's product strategy the Audi Q8 shares its platform with the Lamborghini Urus, among other products.

European models went on sale in July 2018, and arrived at dealers in August 2018. Early models included Q8 50 TDI. 55 TFSI and 45 TDI were added in 2019.

The plug-in hybrid model, marketed as the Q8 TFSI e quattro is based on the Q8 3.0 TFSI (340 PS) model with a 17.9 kWh battery. Pre-sales began in Germany and other European markets in 2020. Early models included 55 TFSI e quattro, 60 TFSI e quattro.

Concept models

Audi Q8 concept (2017) 
The concept vehicle was unveiled on 9 January 2017, at the North American International Auto Show (NAIAS) in Detroit, Michigan.

Audi Q8 sport concept (2017) 

The concept vehicle was unveiled in 2017 Geneva International Motor Show. It included a 3.0 TFSI engine rated , electric motor rated  and  torque (total power  and  torque),  fuel tank.

SQ8

SQ8 4.0 TDI quattro 
A performance-focused version called the Audi SQ8 was launched in June 2019 with chassis revisions, and styling and technology upgrades. Performance is sent through the 8-speed Tiptronic automatic gearbox to its quattro all-wheel drive system.

The new turbochargers are situated within the “V” of the engine block, which Audi claims creates better engine response. To further reduce the effects of turbo lag, the engine features sequential turbocharging, with only a small charger active at low engine speeds and a larger charger engaging above 2,200rpm. An electric-powered compressor assists the turbocharger when starting and accelerating from lower speeds, compensating for the turbo's lack of boost at low revs by adding extra pressure to the intake to smooths out power delivery.

The compressor is also fed by the same 48V lithium-ion battery pack which supports the SQ8's mild-hybrid system.

The SQ8 comes with adaptive air suspension and Drive Select dynamic handling system as standards. Advanced suspension package is available as an optional extra, adding four-wheel steering, sport differential and electromechanical active anti-roll bars.

Styling differences include 21-inch alloy wheels, a revised, more aggressive bodykit, new rear diffuser with oval exhaust tips as standard. Larger 22-inch alloys, Matrix LED headlights, red brake calipers and carbon-ceramic brakes are available as optional extras.

The interior features leather and Alcantara-trimmed sports seats, stainless steel pedals, digital instrument cluster and center-mounted screens which control infotainment, heating and air conditioning systems. Voice control, Wi-Fi hotspot and Amazon Alexa, Android Auto and Apple CarPlay support are standard.

Safety technology includes adaptive cruise control, traffic jam assist, active lane assist and a 360-degree camera. It includes a maneuvering assist system which Audi claims to help soften low-speed parking collisions by applying small steering and braking corrections along with a curb warning system which helps prevent damage to the alloys. Deliveries in the UK started in September 2019.

SQ8 4.0 TFSI quattro 

European model (507PS) went on sale in autumn 2020. It went on sale in late spring 2020 in the United States as the sole SQ8 model.

RS Q8

The RS Q8 was unveiled at the 2019 LA Auto Show in November. Like the SQ8, performance is sent through the 8-speed Tiptronic automatic gearbox (ZF 8HP90) to its quattro all-wheel drive system. Audi claims  in 3.8 seconds. A live-link suspension is featured at the front and the rear along with adaptive air suspension standard with controlled damping. The interior features Audi's MMI dual-touchscreen setup with RS specific displays, as well as RS-embossed sport seats in black pearl Nappa leather and Alcantara and an RS leather-covered flat-bottom steering wheel. Styling differences include an RS-specific grille, larger air intakes, bespoke trim strips and an available sport exhaust system with black tailpipe trim. The standard wheels on the RS Q8 are 22-inch, 10-spoke aluminum wrapped in 295/40-series tires, while 23-inch wheels are optional. Deliveries in the UK will start in early 2020.

For the 2021 model year, all Q8s will come with blind-spot monitoring, and the base Premium trim's Convenience package will include a heated steering wheel and a 360-degree parking camera.

European model went on sale in 1st quarter of 2020.

Powertrain

Production
Q8's components were made in structural components shop within the Münchsmünster production site.

Awards
Q8 won Auto Zeitungs Auto Trophy 2020 award under Luxury SUV category.

Marketing
As part of Q8 launch, in May 2018, Audi started a cinematic styled miniseries that teases the Audi Q8 in five short episodes. The car made its first full appearance in the fifth episode, presented on a special microsite and shown to the public at the Audi China Brand Summit in Shenzhen.

As part of Audi's sponsorship of Spider-Man: Far From Home, Audi Q8 appeared in the movie.

References

External links

Q8
Luxury crossover sport utility vehicles
Luxury sport utility vehicles
Mid-size sport utility vehicles
Cars introduced in 2018
All-wheel-drive vehicles
2020s cars